The Elephant's Rock is a large boulder of trachyte and andesite, eroded by the atmospheric agents that gave it the shape of an elephant. It is about 4 meters high. 

The rock is located near Castelsardo, Sardinia, to the left of the old road that led from the hamlet of Multeddu to the village of Sedini.

The Elephant's Rock has a great archaeological importance, because two domus de janas, ancient tombs dating back to the pre-nuragic period, have been carved inside.

References 

Archaeological sites in Sardinia